Karl "Bratt-Kalle" Holmström (21 March 1925 – 22 June 1974) was a Swedish ski jumper who won a bronze medal in the individual large hill at the 1952 Winter Olympics in Oslo. He died in a road accident aged 49.

References

External links
 

1925 births
1974 deaths
People from Bjurholm Municipality
Swedish male ski jumpers
Olympic bronze medalists for Sweden
Olympic ski jumpers of Sweden
Ski jumpers at the 1952 Winter Olympics
Olympic medalists in ski jumping
Medalists at the 1952 Winter Olympics
Sportspeople from Västerbotten County